Snakkerburen is a village in Leeuwarden municipality in the province of Friesland, the Netherlands. It had a population of around 225 in January 2017.

History 
The village was first mentioned in 1664 as Snackerbuyren. The etymology is unknown.

Snakkerburen was originally an agriculture community. During the 15th century, some shopkeepers from Leeuwarden moved in, because it was outside the jurisdiction of the city. In the 17th century, brickworks and kiln were established along the canalised . In 1840, Snakkerburen was home to 287 people.

Gallery

References

Leeuwarden
Populated places in Friesland